The Panama Canal Railway is a railway line linking the Atlantic Ocean to the Pacific Ocean in Central America. Because of the difficult physical conditions of the route and state of technology, the construction was renowned as an international engineering achievement, one that cost US$8 million and the lives of an estimated 5,000 to 10,000 workers. Opened in 1855, the railway preceded the Panama Canal by half a century; the railway was vital in assisting the construction of the canal in the early 1900s. With the opening of the canal, the railroad's route was changed as a result of the creation of Gatun Lake, which flooded part of the original route. Following World War II, the railroad's importance declined and much of it fell into a state of neglect until 1998, when a project to rebuild the railroad to haul intermodal traffic began; the new railroad opened in 2001.

The original line was built by the United States and the principal incentive was the vast increase in passenger and freight traffic from the Eastern United States to California following the 1849 California Gold Rush. The United States Congress had provided subsidies to companies to operate mail and passenger steamships on the coasts, and supported some funds for construction of the railroad, which began in 1850; the first revenue train ran over the full length on January 28, 1855. Referred to as an inter-oceanic railroad when it opened, it was later also described by some as representing a "transcontinental" railroad, despite traversing only the narrow isthmus connecting the North and South American continents. For a time the Panama Railroad also owned and operated ocean-going ships that provided mail and passenger service to a few major US East Coast and West Coast cities, respectively.

Known as the Panama Railroad Company when founded in the 19th century, today it is operated as Panama Canal Railway Company (reporting mark: PCRC). Since 1998 it has been jointly owned by Kansas City Southern and Mi-Jack Products and leased to the government of Panama. The Panama Canal Railway is primarily dedicated to freight transport, but it also operates a passenger service between Panama City and Colón.

History of earlier isthmus crossings and plans 
The Spanish improved what they called the Camino Real (royal road), and later the Las Cruces trail, built and maintained for transportation of cargo and passengers across the Isthmus of Panama. These were the main routes across the isthmus for more than three centuries. By the 19th century businessmen thought it was time to develop a cheaper, safer, and faster alternative. Railroad technology had developed in the early 19th century. Given the cost and difficulty of constructing a canal with the available technology, a railway seemed the ideal solution.

President Bolívar of La Gran Colombia (Venezuela, Ecuador, Panama, Colombia) commissioned a study into the possibility of building a railway from Chagres (on the Chagres River) to the town of Panama City. This study was carried out between 1827 and 1829, just as railroads were being invented. The report stated that such a railway might be possible. However, the idea was shelved.

In 1836, United States President Andrew Jackson commissioned a study of proposed routes for inter-oceanic communication in order to protect the interests of Americans traveling between the oceans and those living in the developing Oregon Country of the Pacific Northwest. The United States acquired a franchise for a trans-Isthmian railroad; however, the scheme was disrupted by the economic downturn after the business panic of 1837, and came to nothing.

In 1838 a French company was given a concession for the construction of a road, rail, or canal route across the isthmus. The proposed project collapsed for lack of technology and funding needed.

Following the United States' acquisition of Alta California in 1846, the Oregon Territory in 1848, and the Mexican–American War and with the prospective movement of many more settlers to and from the West Coast, the United States again turned its attention to securing a safe, reliable, and speedy link between the Atlantic and Pacific oceans. In 1846 the United States signed a treaty with Colombia (then the Republic of New Granada) by which the United States guaranteed Colombian sovereignty over Panama and was authorized to build a railroad or canal at the Panamanian isthmus, guaranteeing its open transit.

In 1847, the east–west transit across the isthmus was by native dugout canoe (and later by modified lifeboats) up the often dangerous Chagres River. Travelers had to go overland by mules for the final  over the old Spanish trails. A transit from the Atlantic to the Pacific or vice versa would usually take four to eight days by dugout canoe and mule. The transit was fraught with dangers, and travelers were subject to contracting tropical diseases along the way.

William H. Aspinwall, the man who had won the bid for the building and operating the Pacific mail steamships, conceived a plan to construct a railway across the isthmus. He and his partners created a company registered in New York, the Panama Railroad Company, raised $1,000,000 from the sale of stock, and hired companies to conduct engineering and route studies. Their venture happened to be well-timed, as the discovery of gold in California in January 1848 created a rush of emigrants wanting to cross the Isthmus of Panama to go to California.

The first steamship used on the Pacific run was the $200,000 three-mast, dual-paddle steamer . When it sailed around the Cape Horn of South America, it was the first steamship on the west coast of South and North America. In San Francisco nearly all its crew except the captain deserted to seek their fortunes in the city and the gold fields. The ship was stranded for about four months until the company could buy a new supply of coal and hire a new – and much more expensive – crew.

The route between California and Panama was soon frequently traveled, as it provided one of the fastest links between San Francisco, California, and the East Coast cities, about 40 days' transit in total. Nearly all the gold that was shipped out of California went by the fast Panama route. Several new and larger paddle steamers were soon plying this new route.

1855 Panama Railroad

Construction
In January 1849, Aspinwall hired Colonel George W. Hughes to lead a survey party and pick a proposed Panama Railroad roadbed to Panama City. The eventual survey turned out to be full of errors, omissions, and optimistic forecasts, which made it of little use. In April 1849, William Henry Aspinwall was chosen head of the Panama Railroad company, which was incorporated in the State of New York and initially raised $1,000,000 in capital.

In early 1850, George Law, owner of the Pacific Mail Steamship Company, bought up the options of the land from the mouth of the Chagres River to the end of Navy Bay in order to force the directors of the new Panama Railroad to give him a position on the board of the company. Since there were no harbor facilities on the Atlantic side of the isthmus, they needed to create a town with docking facilities to unload their railroad supplies there. Refusing to allow Law onto the board, the directors decided to start building harbor facilities, an Atlantic terminus, and their railroad from the vacant site of Manzanillo Island.

The board solicited bids from construction companies in the United States to build the railroad. George Totten and John Trautwine initially submitted one of the winning bids. After surveying the railroad's proposed course and the probable construction difficulties and uncertainties, they withdrew their bid. Totten agreed to become the chief engineer on the railroad construction project, working for a salary instead of as a general contractor.

A new town on the Atlantic end of the railroad would have to be built on swampy ground that was often awash at high tide. The mangrove, palms, and poisonous manchineel (manzanilla) trees and other jungle vegetation had to be felled, and many of the buildings in the new town had to be built on stilts to keep them above the water. As more worker housing was needed, abandoned ships brought to the mouth of the Chagres River as part of the California Gold Rush were towed near the island and used for temporary housing. A steam-powered pile driver was brought from New York. Docks were constructed on pile-driven timbers, more of the island was stripped of vegetation, and elevated living spaces, docks, warehouses, and the like were constructed.

Before the railroad construction could get fully started, the island was connected to the Panamanian mainland by a causeway supported by pile-driven timbers. The first rolling stock consisting of a steam locomotive built by William Sellers & Co., and several gondola cars arrived in February 1851. The required steam locomotives, railroad cars, ties, rails, and other equipment were unloaded at the newly constructed docks and driven across the track laid across the about  causeway separating the island from the mainland. This causeway connected the Atlantic terminus to the railroad and allowed the ties, iron rails, steam engines, workers, backfill, and other construction material to be hauled onto the mainland. Later, passengers and freight would go the same way. As the railroad progressed, more of the island was filled in, and the causeway was expanded to permanently connect the island to the mainland; its island status disappeared and the town of Aspinwall was created.

In May 1850, the first preparations were begun on Manzanillo Island, and the start of the roadway was partially cleared of trees and jungle on the mainland. Quickly, the difficulty of the scheme became apparent. When they tried to build a railroad near Aspinwall, the swamps were apparently deep, often requiring over 200 feet (60 m) of gravel backfill to secure a roadbed. Fortunately, they had found a quarry near Porto Bello, Panama, so they could load sandstone onto barges and tow it to Aspinwall to get the backfill needed to build the roadbed.

Built as the steam revolution was just starting, the only power equipment was a steam-driven pile driver, steam tugs, and steam locomotives equipped with gondola and dump cars for carrying fill material; the rest of the work had to be done by laborers wielding machete, axe, pick, shovel, black powder, and mule cart. As more track was laid, the workers had to continually add backfill to the roadbed, as it continued to slowly sink into the swamp. This was soon converted to a cemetery that accepted nearly continuous burials.

Cholera, yellow fever, and malaria took a deadly toll on workers. Despite the company's constant importation of high numbers of new workers, there were times when progress stalled for simple lack of workers. All supplies and nearly all foodstuffs had to be imported from thousands of miles away, greatly adding to the cost of construction. Laborers came from the United States, the Caribbean Islands, and as far away as Ireland, India, China, and Australia.

The project's fortunes turned in November 1851 – just as they were running out of the original $1,000,000 – when two large paddle steamers, the SS Georgia and the SS Philadelphia, with about 1,000 passengers, were forced to shelter in Limón Bay, Panama, owing to a hurricane in the Caribbean. Since the railroad's docks had been completed by this time and rail had been laid  up to Gatún on the Chagres River, it was possible to unload the ships' cargoes of emigrants and their luggage and transport them by rail, using flatcars and gondolas, for at least the first part of their journey up the Chagres River on their way to Panama City. Desperate to get off the ships and across the isthmus, the gold seekers paid $0.50 per mile and $3.00 per 100 pounds of luggage to be hauled to the end of the track. This infusion of money saved the company and made it possible to raise more capital to make it an ongoing moneymaker. Each year it added more and more track and charged more for its services. This greatly boosted the value of the company's franchise, enabling it to sell more stock to finance the remainder of the project, which took more than $8,000,000 and cost 5,000 to 10,000 workers' lives to complete.

By July 1852, the company had finished  of track and reached the Chagres River, where an enormous bridge was to be built. Work was begun on a much higher, hefty iron bridge, which took more than a year to finish. In all, the company built more than 170 more bridges and culverts.

Several months were spent digging. In March 1854, 700 Chinese laborers arrived to work for the Panama Railroad Company. Decades later, the Panama Canal project required years to cut through this area deeply enough for a canal. The road over the crest of the continental divide at Culebra was completed from the Atlantic side in January 1855; 37 miles (60 km) of track having been laid from Aspinwall (Colón). A second team, working under less harsh conditions with railroad track, ties, railroad cars, steam locomotives, and other supplies brought around Cape Horn by ship, completed its  of track from Panama City to the summit from the Pacific side of the isthmus at the same time.

Chief engineer George Totten, in pouring rain with a nine-pound maul, drove the spike that completed the railroad. The next day the first locomotive with freight and passenger cars passed from sea to sea. The huge project was completed.

Upon completion the railroad stretched 47 miles, 3,020 feet (76 km), with a maximum grade of 60 feet to the mile (11.4 m/km, or 1.14%). This gauge was that of the southern United States railway companies at the time. This gauge was converted to standard in the United States in May 1886 after the American Civil War, and remained in use in Panama until the railroad was rebuilt in 2001.

The next step was making things permanent and upgrading the railway. Hastily erected wooden bridges that quickly rotted in the tropical heat and often torrential rain had to be replaced with iron bridges. Wooden trestles had to be converted to gravel embankments before they rotted away. The original pine railroad ties lasted only about a year, and had to be replaced with ties made of lignum vitae, a wood so hard that they had to drill the ties before driving in the screw spikes. The line was eventually built as double track.

The railroad became one of the most profitable in the world. Upon completion, the railway was proclaimed an engineering marvel of the era. Until the opening of the Panama Canal, it carried the heaviest volume of freight per unit length of any railroad in the world. The existence of the railway was one of the keys to the selection of Panama as the site of the canal.

In 1881 the French Compagnie Universelle du Canal Interocéanique purchased controlling interest in the Panama Railway Company. In 1904, the United States government under Theodore Roosevelt purchased the railway from the French canal company. Much of this equipment was worn out or obsolete and had to be scrapped.

Financing 

The railway cost some US$8 million to build – eight times the initial 1850 estimate – and presented considerable engineering challenges, passing over mountains and through swamps. Over 300 bridges and culverts needed to be built along the route.

It was built and financed by private companies from the United States. Among the key individuals in building the railway were William H. Aspinwall, David Hoadley, George Muirson Totten, and John Lloyd Stephens. The company bought exclusive rights from the government of Colombia (then known as Republic of New Granada, of which Panama was a part) to build the railroad across the isthmus.

The railway carried significant traffic even while it was under construction, with traffic carried by canoe and mules over the unfinished sections. This had not been originally intended, but people crossing the isthmus to California and returning east were eager to use such track as had been laid. When only  of track had been completed, the railway was doing a brisk business, charging $0.50 per mile per person for the train ride and increasing to $25 per person (first class) when the line was finally completed. By the time the line was officially completed and the first revenue train ran over the full length of its grade on January 28, 1855, more than one-third of its $8 million cost had already been paid for from fares and freight tariffs.

At $25, the first-class fare, one way, was one of the highest rates in existence for a  ride. High prices for carrying freight and passengers, despite very expensive ongoing maintenance and upgrades, made the railroad one of the most profitable in the world. Engineering and medical difficulties made the Panama Railway the most expensive railway, per unit length of track, built at the time.

Death toll 
It is estimated that from 5,000 to 10,000 people may have died in the construction of the railroad, though the Panama Railway company kept no official count and the total may be higher or lower. Cholera, malaria, and yellow fever killed thousands of workers, who were from the United States, Europe, Colombia, China, the Caribbean islands, and also included some African slaves. Many of these workers had come to Panama to seek their fortune and had arrived with little or no identification. Many died with no known next of kin, nor permanent address, nor even a known surname.

Shipping lines 
The Panama Railway operated a significant shipping line, connecting its service with New York and San Francisco. It ran a Central American line of steamships linking Nicaragua, Costa Rica, San Salvador, and Guatemala to Panama City. The shipping service was greatly expanded when canal construction began.

1904–12 rebuild: Panama Canal building and afterward 
In 1904 the United States obtained consent from the newly-formed Panamanian government to build and operate a canal. The choice to use locks and an artificial lake (Gatun) meant that the old railway route from 1855 had to be changed because it followed the Chagres River valley, which would be flooded by the lake. Also, the railway would be extended and altered continuously for the building process. The stock of the Panama Railway Company, vital in canal construction, was entirely controlled by the United States Secretary of War.

Canal construction years
The construction of the Panama Canal was envisioned by John Frank Stevens, chief American railroad construction engineer, as a huge earthmoving project using the extended railroad system. Many tracks were added temporally to transport the sand and rock from the excavation. Stevens used the biggest and most durable equipment available. The French equipment was nearly all judged obsolete, worn out, or too light duty, and nearly all their railroad equipment was not built for heavy-duty use. Some of this French equipment was melted down and converted into medals presented to men working on the Panama Canal.

Also, since the 1855 route followed the Chagres valley (which would become Gatun Lake), the route had to change. The new railroad, starting in 1904, had to be greatly upgraded with heavy-duty double-tracked rails over most of the line to accommodate all the new rolling stock of about 115 powerful locomotives, 2,300 dirt spoils railroad cars, and 102 railroad-mounted steam shovels brought in from the United States and elsewhere. This work was commenced by the first chief engineer, John Findley Wallace (1904–1905).

The steam shovels were some of the largest in the world when they were introduced. The new permanent railroad closely paralleled the canal where it could and was moved and reconstructed where it interfered with the canal work. In addition to moving and expanding the railroad where needed, considerable track additions, extensive machine shops and maintenance facilities were added, and other upgrades were made to the rail system. These improvements were started at about the same time the extensive mosquito abatement projects were undertaken, by Stevens, to make it safer to work in Panama. Once the mosquitoes were under control, much of the railroad was ready to go to work.

The railway greatly assisted the building of the Panama Canal. Besides hauling millions of tons of men, equipment, and supplies, the railroad did much more. Essentially all of the hundreds of millions of cubic yards of material removed from the required canal cuts were broken up by explosives, loaded by steam shovels, mounted on one set of railroad tracks, loaded onto rail cars, and hauled out by locomotives pulling the spoils cars running on parallel tracks.

Most of the cars carrying the dirt spoils were wooden flat cars lined with steel floors that used a crude but effective unloading device, the Lidgerwood system. The railroad cars had only one side, and steel aprons bridged the spaces between them. The rock and dirt were first blasted loose by explosives. Two sets of tracks were then built or moved up to where the loosened material lay. The steam shovels, moving on one set of tracks, picked up the loosened dirt and piled it on the flat cars traveling on a parallel set of tracks. The dirt was piled high against the one closed side of the car. The train moved forward until all cars were filled. A typical train had 20 dirt cars arranged as essentially one long car.

On arrival of the train at one of the approximately 60 different dumping grounds, a three-ton steel plow was put on the last car (or a car carrying the plow was attached as the last car) and a huge winch with a braided steel cable stretching the length of all cars was attached to the engine. The winch, powered by the train's steam engine, pulled the plow the length of the dirt loaded train by winching up the steel cable. The plow scraped the dirt off the railroad cars, allowing the entire trainload of dirt cars to be unloaded in ten minutes or less. The plow and winch were then detached for use on another train. Another plow, mounted on a steam engine, then plowed the dirt spoils away from the track.

When the fill got large enough, the track was relocated on top of the old fill to allow almost continuous unloading of new fill with minimal effort. When the steam shovels or dirt trains needed to move to a new section, techniques were developed by William Bierd, former head of the Panama Railroad, to lift large sections of track and their attached ties by steam-powered cranes and relocate them intact, without disassembling and rebuilding the track. A dozen men could move a mile of track a day – the work previously done by up to 600 men. This allowed the tracks used by both the steam shovels and dirt trains to be quickly moved to wherever they were needed. While constructing the Culebra Cut (Gaillard Cut), about 160 loaded dirt trains went out daily and returned empty.

Nearly all this equipment was built by new, extensive machine-building technology developed and made in the United States by companies such as the Joshua Hendy Iron Works. 

In addition operation of the canal used large refrigeration systems for making ice, large electrical motors to power the pumps and controls on the canal's locks, and other new technology. Extensive electrical generation and distribution systems were built, one of the first large-scale uses of large electrical motors. Electricity-powered donkey engines pulled the ships through the locks on railroad tracks laid parallel to the locks.

Permanent railroad

New technology not available in the 1850s allowed earth cuts and fills to be used on the new railroad that were many times larger than those done in the original 1851–1855 construction. The rebuilt, much improved, and often rerouted Panama Railway continued alongside the new canal and across Gatun Lake. The railroad was completed in its final configuration in 1912, two years before the canal, at a cost of $9 million—$1 million more than the original.

After World War II, few additional improvements were made to the Panama Railway. The United States returned control of the railroad to Panama in 1979, and conditions began to decline. Recognizing the railroad was operating far below its potential, in 1998 the government of Panama offered private companies a 50-year concession to take over and rebuild the railroad.

Except for dedicated railroad sections, such as the concrete factory, the broad  gauge was used. This gauge was also used for the locomotives along the locks ("mules"). When the gauge for the railroad was changed in 2001, the mules kept the broad gauge.

2001 reconstruction

On , the government of Panama turned over control of the railroad to the private Panama Canal Railway Company (PCRC), a joint venture between Kansas City Southern and gantry crane manufacturer Mi-Jack Products. The new company decided to rebuild the railroad line to handle container traffic parallel to the canal. The railroad projected it could move containers across Panama eight times as fast as the canal. Work on the new railroad started in January 2000, and was complete in July 2001 at a cost of $76 million. Passenger service began at that time, with freight service started a few months later. Two container handling terminals were created: on the Atlantic side, near Manzanillo International Terminal (Colón), and the Pacific Intermodal Terminal near Balboa Harbour. Passenger stations are in Colón (called Atlantic Passenger Station) and Corozal railway station,  from Panama City.

Tracks

The renovation project involved the laying of new ballast, sleepers (ties), and rail. The rails were replaced with  continuously welded rail, purchased from Sydney Steel Corporation in Sydney, Nova Scotia, Canada. Similarly, the crushed rock used for ballast was purchased from Martin Marietta Materials in Auld's Cove, Nova Scotia, Canada. Concrete sleepers (ties) were used to avoid termite and other insect damage. The route was realigned slightly, with a shortcut added around the Gatún locks. The line is now single track, with some strategically placed sections of double track (near Gamboa and Monte Lirio). The floor of the old Miraflores Tunnel was lowered to accommodate the extra height of double-stacked containers. A maintenance shop was built near Colón that can also receive the container-loading portal cranes, which are also owned and operated by PCRC.

Passenger service and freight capacity 

, one passenger service per direction was offered every Monday thru Friday. The Corozal (Panama City)–Colón train has a traveling time of one hour.

While the main purpose of the train is as a commuter rail for those living in Panama City and working in Colon, it has also become a tourist excursion. As it was used during the construction of the canal, it runs parallel to the canal and offers views of the canal. The rail cars are classic in nature, with first-class amenities, bar service, with second-level viewing areas and outdoor viewing.

For freight services – that is, transporting containers across the isthmus – the initial capacity allows for 10 trains to run in each direction per 24 hours. With the current rail configuration, this could be extended to a maximum of 32 trains per 24 hours. A train is composed of double-stack bulkhead-type rail cars, typically containing 75 containers, a mix of 60 × 40' and 15 × 20' containers. The basic capacity is around 500,000 container moves a year (approximately 900,000 TEU), with a maximum capacity of 2 million TEU per year.

Containers are transported to and from nearby dock container stacks by truck on a dedicated road.

, the railroad was handling about 1,500 containers per day. The Panama Canal carries some 33,500 containers each day.

2020 Chagres River bridge damage
On June 23, 2020, the bulk carrier (freighter) "Bluebill" struck the railway bridge crossing the Chagres River, near Gamboa, severely damaging the bridge and severing the rail route approximately midway between the two terminals.

Rolling stock

Original railroad
Many of the early locomotives were built by the Portland Company. All were five-foot gauge.

2001 rebuild
In the 2001 rebuild, most rolling stock was replaced, too, as the line was switched to standard gauge. The railroad has a fleet of several historic passenger cars in service, including PCRC #102, which is a vintage dome car first built by the Southern Pacific Railroad in 1955. The passenger cars are Clocker coaches built by the Budd Company and leased from Amtrak.

The locomotive numbering scheme begins with 1855, honoring the year in which the original Panama Railroad was completed.

The rebuilt railway's revenue freight rolling stock consists of 5-well, articulated, double-stack container railcars with bulkheads. The 265-foot-long car sets were built by Gunderson Inc. and each car set can hold ten 40 foot containers. The bottom level in each well can hold two 20 foot containers instead of one 40 foot unit. The intermodal terminals at each end can accommodate trains of 11 of these cars, which carry a total of up to 110 forty-foot equivalent units (FEUs).

Gallery

See also 

 Panama Canal Zone
 History of rail transport
 Rail transport in Panama
 Transcontinental Railroad
 Transportation in Panama
 Tramways of Panama
 Panama Metro
 Railroads of Haiti

References

Sources cited

Further reading 
 Why the Panama Route Was Originally Chosen. By Crisanto Medina, Envoy Extraordinary and Minister Plenipotentiary from Guatemala to France. Publisher: The North American Review, Vol. 177, (September 1, 1903)
 The story of Panama: the new route to India. By Frank A. Gause and Charles Carl Carr. Publishers: Silver, Burdett and Company 1912

External links 

 Panama Canal Railway Company – official site
 The Panama Railroad – an unofficial page on the Panama Railroad
 Panama Railroad: Stock Certificates – an 1855 newspaper report of its opening, 1861 & 1913 maps, early Harper's engravings, and 1861 schedule
1860s North American Steamship Co. – Panama Railroad ticket from San Francisco to New York
 "Gun Train Guards Ends of Panama Canal -- Rolling Fort Crosses Isthmus in Two Hours" Popular Mechanics, December 1934 pp.844-845 – article includes drawings
 Construction engines and rolling-stock recovered from the bottom of Gatun lake 

Panama Canal
Railway companies of Panama
Railway lines in Panama
Kansas City Southern Railway
Portages
History of Panama
Railway lines opened in 1855
Standard gauge railways in Panama
5 ft gauge railways in Panama
1855 establishments in the Republic of New Granada